Jay Ferguson may refer to:
Jay Ferguson (American musician) (born 1947), band member of Spirit and Jo Jo Gunne
Jay Ferguson (Canadian musician) (born 1968), band member of Sloan
Jay R. Ferguson (born 1974), American actor